Putni tovaruš (English: Travel companion) is a prayer book written in 1660 by Croatian poet and noblewoman Katarina Zrinska on her estates in Ozalj. It was first published a year later in Venice.

Contents and description
The book was completed on August 1, 1660 on Katarina Zrinski's estates in Ozalj, as can be seen from the introductory text, and was published in the printing press Babiani in Venice during 1661. In the same foreword titled Vsega hervatckoga i slovinskoga orsaga gospodi i poglavitim ljudem obojega spola (To all noble people of the Croatian and Slavic states of both sexes), Zrinska introduces herself as a enlightened Croatian noblewoman whose work is motivated by her religious convictions and patriotism. This was followed by a skillfully constructed poem Vsakomu onomu, ki štal bude ove knjižice, written in octosyllable, which is reminiscent of high quality Baroque poetry of the 17th century, which further reflect the author's intentions:

Ni za drugo navom svitu
Človik stvoren od ruk Boga,
Kad mu dušu plemenitu
Da srid raja zemaljskoga,
Neg da ovde tako hodi,
Tako živi i putuje,
Da se v smerti prav nahodi
I da v nebu gospoduje.
Zač Bog stvori vnoge staze,
Vnoge pute i načine,
Neg da po njih ljudi plaze
Do nebeske domovine.
Zato knjige, zato pisma,
Zapovidi i zakoni
Poda, da ki ide š njima,
Večnu radost mu nakloni.
...Katarine Zrinski i njihovi molitvenici, Novak

Most of the prayers of the book were translated from German language into Croatian, using a dialectal mixture of Chakavian, Štokavian and Kajkavian, as a representative of the Ozalj literary circle. Much of the text is considered to be of high literary quality, which led to its reissues in 1687 and 1715, Ljubljana. According to critic and poet , some of the prose texts reach the expressive achievements of poetry, calling the work a jewel in the Croatian baroque literature and one of its most important achievements.

Example

References

Further reading
 Putni tovaruš. Ana Katarina Zrinska und der Ozaljski krug, Inge Lehmann, Slavistische Beiträge, Bd. 259., München, O. Sagner, 1990.,  (pdf)
 Putni tovarus / vnogimi lipimi, nouimi i pobosnimi molituami iz nimskoga na heruaczki jezik isztomachen i spraulyen po meni groff Frankopan Catharini goszpodina groffa Petra Zrinszkoga hisnom touarussu, digitalna.nsk.hr

Christian prayer books
1661 books
Croatian non-fiction literature